Stadhuis (Dutch for town hall) is an underground subway station in the city of Rotterdam, and is located on Rotterdam Metro lines D and E. The station opened on 9 February 1968, the same date that the North-South Line (also temporarily called Erasmus line), of which it is a part, was opened.

The station is located in the center of Rotterdam, underneath the Coolsingel, a major street through the center.

Rotterdam Metro stations
RandstadRail stations in Rotterdam
Railway stations opened in 1968
1968 establishments in the Netherlands
Railway stations in the Netherlands opened in the 20th century
Railway stations in the Netherlands opened in the 1960s